Rathvilly Moat is a motte and National Monument located in County Carlow, Ireland.

Location
Rathvilly Moat is located in the townland of Knockroe about 1 km east of Rathvilly village, east of the River Slaney.

History and archaeology
The moat of Rathvilly was the residence of Crimthann mac Énnai, an Uí Cheinnselaig King of Leinster, who reigned c. 443–483 and was baptised by Saint Patrick. The placename means "ringfort of the sacred tree"; a bile was sacred to a certain family or ancestral group, and destroying an enemy clan's bile was a common act of war.

References

Archaeological sites in County Carlow
National Monuments in County Carlow